Buhach may refer to:
Buhach, California
Buhach Colony High School
Buhach Grammar School on the National Register of Historic Places